Cossaea or Kossaia was a Greek town in ancient Thrace. It was a member of the Delian League, appearing in Athenian tribute lists of 425/4 BCE.

Its site has not been located.

References

Populated places in ancient Thrace
Former populated places in Greece
Members of the Delian League
Lost ancient cities and towns